Lauren Schmidt-Hissrich is an American television producer and screenwriter. She is the series creator of the television series The Witcher.

Early life
She was raised in Westerville, Ohio, and graduated from Wittenberg University in Springfield, Ohio, in 2000 with a BA in English literature and creative writing.

Career
She has written scripts for television series The West Wing and Justice, as well as written and produced shows such as Parenthood, Do No Harm, Private Practice, Daredevil, The Defenders and The Umbrella Academy. She is the show runner and executive producer of The Witcher, a Netflix original series based on the book series by Andrzej Sapkowski.

In 2021, it was reported that she had signed an overall deal with Netflix.

Filmography

Television

Personal life
She lives in Los Angeles with her husband Michael Hissrich—who is also a television producer—and two sons.

References

External links
 
 
 Content in this edit is translated from the existing Spanish Wikipedia article at Lauren Schmidt Hissrich; see its history for attribution.

American women television producers
American television writers
Wittenberg University alumni
American women television writers
American women screenwriters
People from Westerville, Ohio
Screenwriters from Ohio
Television producers from Ohio
Showrunners
1978 births
Living people
21st-century American women writers
21st-century American screenwriters